(The) Brothers Under the Skin may refer to:

 Brothers Under the Skin, a 1922 silent comedy film
 Brothers Under the Skin, a book by Carey McWilliams
 The Brothers Under the Skin, a 1986 TVB series